Tim Browne (born 27 December 1987) is an Australian former professional rugby league footballer who last played for the Penrith Panthers in the National Rugby League. He previously played for the Canterbury-Bankstown Bulldogs

Background
Born in Penrith, New South Wales, Browne played his junior football for the Raymond Terrace Roosters. He missed selection for the Newcastle Knights' S. G. Ball Cup squad in 2006, but returned to youth club football with the South Sydney Rabbitohs in the Jersey Flegg Cup at age 19. Browne later signed with the Manly Warringah Sea Eagles.

Playing career

Early career
In 2009, Browne played for Manly's Queensland Cup team, the Sunshine Coast Sea Eagles. He played in their 2009 Queensland Cup Grand Final win over the Northern Pride RLFC.

Canterbury-Bankstown Bulldogs
Browne joined the Canterbury-Bankstown Bulldogs in 2010. He made his NRL debut in round 5 against the New Zealand Warriors. On 7 July 2010, he played for the New South Wales Residents against the Queensland Residents. On 9 September 2010, he was named on the interchange bench in the 2010 New South Wales Cup Team of the Year. On 3 October 2010, he played in Canterbury-Bankstown's 2010 New South Wales Cup Grand Final win over the Windsor Wolves.

On 2 October 2011, Browne played in Canterbury-Bankstown's 2011 New South Wales Cup Grand Final win over the Auckland Vulcans

Browne was named in Canterbury-Bankstown's squad for the 2014 NRL Auckland Nines.

On 24 July 2014, Browne extended his contract with Canterbury-Bankstown from the end of 2015 to the end of 2016.

On 31 January and 1 February 2015, Browne played for Canterbury-Bankstown in the 2015 NRL Auckland Nines.

Browne was named in Canterbury-Bankstown's 2016 NRL Auckland Nines squad.

Penrith Panthers
Browne signed a three-year contract with the Penrith Panthers starting in 2017.
In 2018, Browne suffered the career-ending bowel injury after being hit in a heavy tackle while playing for the Penrith reserve grade side.  Browne needed to be rushed into emergency surgery where damage to his bowel, spleen, and kidneys was repaired.  He remained in intensive care in Nepean Hospital for two days.  Following the injury, Browne decided to retire from rugby league.

References

External links

Penrith Panthers profile
Bulldogs profile
Panthers profile
NRL profile

1987 births
Living people
Australian rugby league players
Canterbury-Bankstown Bulldogs players
Penrith Panthers players
Rugby league players from Penrith, New South Wales
Rugby league props
Sunshine Coast Sea Eagles players